Jamie Smith's Mabon are a Welsh folk band renowned for their live performances and their seven albums released between 2001 and 2018. Founded in 1998, the band were in operation until disbanding in 2020.

History 
Founded as 'Mabon' in 1998, the group initially predominantly played Welsh folk tunes, but they soon emerged to develop a more contemporary sound, calling on wide-ranging influences reaching far beyond the traditional canon. Starting with Lumps of Mabon in 2001, the group released four albums as 'Mabon' before re-branding as 'Jamie Smith's Mabon' in 2011. After the next two albums, Windblown (2012) and The Space Between (2015), with winning the 'Best Group' in the 2014 Spiral Earth Awardsand the 2015 Eiserner Eversteiner Award in between, the group marked their 20th anniversary in 2019 with a live album and a worldwide tour.

Renowned for their live performances, Jamie Smith's Mabon took on many world tours and performed well over 1,000 gigs in four continents by 2018 alone. Notable festivals the group have performed at include: Festival Interceltique de Lorient (2010, 2012, 2013, 2014, 2016, 2018); Celtic Connections (2011, 2015, 2019); the Rain Forest World Music Festival in Borneo (being the first Welsh band to perform here); WOMAD UK (2011 and 2017); WOMAD Australia (2019); WOMAD New Zealand; Musicport Festival (2017); Cambridge Folk Festival (2013 and 2017); Sidmouth Folkweek (2017); National Eisteddfod of Wales (2019); Fairport's Cropredy Convention (2011) and Cwlwm Celtaidd (2016).

Musicians who have recorded, performed or collaborated with Jamie Smith's Mabon include: Tomas Callister, Callum Stewart, Adam Rhodes, Dylan Fowler, Will Lang

The group announced their amicable disbanding with a farewell tour for autumn 2020. Although the final date of the tour was planned to be in June 2020, coronavirus cut the tour months short.

Musical style 
Jamie Smith's Mabon predominantly perform purely instrumental music, thought they also have many songs with vocals. Nearly all of their music is their own composition, predominantly created by Jamie Smith and reflecting their varied interests and influences based in traditional or contemporary Celtic music but also reaching into world music and beyond. Their ability to seamlessly blur 'the boundaries between the heritage of a traditional Celtic legacy and a more contemporary sound' has been noted, as has their 'wide dynamic range, from quiet, reflective melodies and songs to loud and exciting music.' Amongst the latter are tunes such as The Accordionist’s Despair, an incredibly difficult piece described as ‘… an unholy union of Bach and Metallica.’

At the time of their release of Windblown In 2017, folk radio said that:

One of the attractions of Mabon’s music is its untethered nature: traditionally inspired but all original. Rather than create boundaries and confines to work within they also take influences from other folk traditions and beyond

Band members 

 Jamie Smith – Accordion and vocals
 Oli Wilson-Dickson – Fiddle
 Paul Rogers - Guitar
 Matt Downer - Bass
 Iolo Whelan - Drums and percussion

Previous members: Derek Smith (guitar), Gareth Whelan (fiddle), Jason Rogers (bass guitar), David Killgallon (fiddle), Calum Stewart (flute, uilleann pipes), Ruth Angell (fiddle), Tomas Callister (fiddle), Adam Rhodes (bouzouki), and Ronald Jappy (guitar).

Discography 

 Lumps of Mabon (2001)
 Ridiculous Thinkers (2004)
 OK Pewter (2007)
 Live at the Grand Pavilion (2010)
 Windblown (2012)
 The Space Between (2015)
 Twenty - Live! (2018)

Other ensembles of Jamie Smith's Mabon members 
 Barrule
 Scran
 Alaw
 Skeeal

References

External links 
 Official website

Welsh folk musicians
Welsh-language bands
British indie folk groups
British folk rock groups
Musical groups established in 1998
Musical groups disestablished in 2020
Manx musical groups